The grapheme Ž (minuscule: ž) is formed from Latin Z with the addition of caron. It is used in various contexts, usually denoting the voiced postalveolar fricative, the sound of English g in mirage, s in vision, or Portuguese and French j. In addition, ž is used as the romanisation of Cyrillic ж in ISO 9 and scientific transliteration.

For use in computer systems, Ž and ž are at Unicode codepoints U+017D and U+017E, respectively.  On Windows computers, it can be typed with Alt+0142 and Alt+0158, respectively.

Ž is the last letter of most alphabets that contain it, but exceptions include Estonian, Karelian, Veps, and Turkmen.

Origin
The symbol originates with the Czech alphabet. In Czech printed books it first appeared in the late 15th century. It evolved from the letter Ż, introduced by the author of the early 15th-century De orthographia Bohemica (probably Jan Hus) to indicate a Slavic fricative not represented in Latin alphabet. The punctus rotundus over was gradually replaced by háček (caron). This orthography later became standard and was popularized by the Bible of Kralice.
It was occasionally used for the closely related Slovak language during the period when it lacked a literary norm. From Czech, it was adopted into the Croatian alphabet by Ljudevit Gaj in 1830, and then into the Slovak, Slovenian, Serbian and Bosnian alphabets. In addition, it features in the orthographies of the Baltic, some Uralic and other languages.

Uses

Slavic languages
It is the 42nd letter of the Czech, the 46th letter of Slovak, the 25th letter of the Slovenian alphabet, the 30th letter of the Croatian, Bosnian, and the same within the Latinic versions of Serbian, Montenegrin, and Macedonian (as a counterpart or transliteration of Cyrillic Ж in the latter three). It is the 27th letter of the Sorbian alphabet, and it appears in the Belarusian latin alphabet.

Occasionally it is used in Russian, Ukrainian, and Belarusian transliterations and even less frequently in Bulgarian transliteration.

For most languages it represents a voiced postalveolar fricative  except in Russian transliterations of Ж where it represents a voiced retroflex fricative .

In Polish, the corresponding letter is Ż/ż.

Baltic languages
It is the 32nd letter of the Lithuanian and 33rd letter of the Latvian alphabets.

Uralic languages
It is the 20th letter of the Estonian alphabet, where it is used in loan words. It is the 22nd letter of the Karelian and Veps alphabets. It is the 29th letter of the Northern Sami alphabet, where it represents . It also features occasionally in Finnish but is not part of the regular alphabet and only regarded as a variant of Z.

In Finnish, the letter ž is only used in loan words, džonkki and maharadža, and in romanization of Russian and other non-Latin alphabets. In Finnish and Estonian, it is possible to replace ž with zh but only when it is technically impossible to typeset the accented character.

In Hungarian, the corresponding letter is the digraph Zs.

Other languages
 It is the 13th letter of the Turkmen alphabet, pronounced .
 It is the 33rd letter of the Laz alphabet, where it represents .
 It is the 27th and last letter of the Songhay alphabet.
 It is used in Persian romanization, equivalent to ژ.
 It is also used in the standard orthography of the Lakota language.
 It is also used (unofficially) in Cypriot Greek to depict , which does not occur in the Standard Modern Greek, or the Greek Alphabet.
 It is, at times, used for romanization of Syriac to represent  in borrowed Iranian words, but the digraph "zh" is more commonly used.

Computing code

See also
Ż
Rz (digraph)
Ź
Dž

Notes

References

Latin letters with diacritics
Phonetic transcription symbols
Czech language
Lithuanian language
Croatian language
Serbian language